is a Japanese actor, voice actor and narrator from Asakusa, Tokyo who is affiliated with Aoni Production. He was a classmate of former prime minister Yasuo Fukuda at Azabu High School. Shibata is married to fellow voice actor Akiko Sekine.

He is most known for his roles in Mazinger Z (as Baron Ashura), Great Mazinger (as Kenzo Kabuto), Galaxy Express 999 (as Count Mecha), Kamen Rider Stronger (as General Shadow).
He's also mostly known for giving his voice to some iconic powerful old characters such as in One Piece (as Monkey D. Dragon), Naruto (as Hiruzen Sarutobi), FullMetal Alchemist (as Führer King Bradley) and Fairy Tail (as Igneel and the narrator).

Filmography

Anime television
Angel Beats! (Computer Technician, ep. 11)
Angolmois: Record of Mongol Invasion (Sō Sukekuni)
Armored Trooper Votoms (Wiseman)
Bakugan: Gundalian Invaders (Nurzak) (Japanese dub)
Blood Blockade Battlefront (Raju Jugei Shizuyoshi)
Boruto: Naruto Next Generations (Hiruzen Sarutobi)
Danganronpa 3: The End of Hope's Peak High School (Kazuo Tengan)
D.Gray Man (Samo Han Wong)
Dragon Ball (King Chapa)
Dragon Ball GT (Il Shenron, Yi Xing Long)
Dragon Quest (Wizard Moore)
Ergo Proxy (Husserl)
Fairy Tail (Narrator, Igneel)
Flame of Recca (Meguri Kyouza)
Fullmetal Alchemist (Führer King Bradley/Pride)
Fullmetal Alchemist: Brotherhood (Führer King Bradley/Wrath)
Galaxy Express 999 (Count Mecha)
Gate Keepers (Count Akuma)
GeGeGe no Kitarō (Bakkubeado)
Ginga: Nagareboshi Gin (Bill)
Great Mazinger (Kenzou Kabuto)
Heat Guy J (Lorenzo Leonelli)
Heavy Metal L-Gaim (Sai Quo Addar)
Jigoku Shōjo (Spider)
Killing Bites (Yōzan Mikado)
Legend of the Galactic Heroes (Gregor von Mückenberger)
Mazinger Z (Baron Ashura)
Magi: The Labyrinth of Magic (Amon)
Miss Kuroitsu from the Monster Development Department (Great Leader Kaiser Lore)
Naruto (Hiruzen Sarutobi)
Naruto Shippuden (Hiruzen Sarutobi)
Nichijou (Melon Bread) 
One Piece (Dragon, Calgara)
Samurai Champloo (Heitaro Kawara)
Seven Knights Revolution: Hero Successor (Germane)
Star Driver: Kagayaki no Takuto (Ikurou Tsunashi)
Space Adventure Cobra (Lord Salamander)
Space Carrier Blue Noah (Satoshi Tsuchikado)
Space Dandy (Judge)
Space Pirate Captain Harlock (Commander Kiruta, Narration)
Saint Seiya (Guilty: Ikki's Master on Death Queen Island)
Saint Seiya Omega (Mars)
Shaman King (Tao Ching)
Super Robot Wars Original Generation: Divine Wars (Daitetsu Minase)
Symphogear G (Masahito Shibata)
Tentai Senshi Sunred (General Hengel)
The Ones Within (Kihachi)
Tiger Mask (Mr. X)
Tiger Mask W (Mr. X)
Transformers: Super-God Masterforce (Devil Z)
Toshinden Subaru (Genma)
Wakusei Robo Dangaurd A (Dantetsu Ichimonji)
Wolverine (Shingen Yashida)

Original video animation (OVA)
Fatal Fury: Legend of the Hungry Wolf (Geese Howard)
Fatal Fury 2: The New Battle (Geese Howard)
Fullmetal Alchemist Seven Homunculi vs. State Alchemists (Führer King Bradley/Pride)
Gate Keepers 21 (Count Akuma)
Guyver (Richard Guyot)

Anime movie
Lupin III: Mystery of Mamo (Special Agent Gordon)
Twelve Months (Additional voice)
Fatal Fury: The Motion Picture (Geese Howard)
Cowboy Bebop: Knockin' on Heaven's Door (Colonel)
Weathering with You
Fullmetal Alchemist the Movie: Conqueror of Shamballa (Mabuse/Fritz Lang)
Hans Christian Andersen's The Little Mermaid (King of the Mermaid)
Kinnikuman Great Riot! Justice Superman (Black Emperor)
Kinnikuman Crisis in New York! (Akuma Shogun)
Locke the Superman (Professor Ramses)
Mobile Suit Gundam III: Encounters in Space (Degwin Sodo Zabi)
Fairy Tail the Movie: Dragon Cry  (Igneel)

Video games

Dragalia Lost (Ryozen)
2nd Super Robot Wars Z Saisei-Hen (Wiseman)
Bushido Blade (Hanzaki)
Castlevania: Lament of Innocence (Rinaldo Gandolfi)
Dragon Ball Z: Budokai 3 (Yi Xing Long)
Dragon Ball Z: Budokai Tenkaichi 2 (Yi Xing Long)
Fist of the North Star (Zeed)
Langrisser IV (Gizlof)
Langrisser V (Gizlof)
Mega Man ZX Advent (Master Thomas)
Sonic and the Black Knight (King Arthur)
Super Smash Bros. (Chrom)
Valkyria Chronicles (Maurits von Borg)
Toshinden 4 (Genma)

Tokusatsu voice
Moero!! Robocon vs Ganbare Robocon!! (1974- 1977) (Voice of Wirz)
Kamen Rider Stronger (1975) (Voice of General Shadow (ep. 14-38))
Akumaizer 3 (1975) (Voice of Tokeiman (ep. 13))
X-Bomber (1980-1981) (Voice of General Kuroda)
Taiyou Sentai SunVulcan (1982) (Voice of The Almighty God (ep. 48-50))
Kamen Rider Black RX (1989) (Voice of General Jark (ep. 45 & 46)/Jark Midla (ep. 46))
Ninja Sentai Kakuranger (1994-1995) (Voice of Youkai Daimaou (ep. 31-53))
Gekisou Sentai Carranger (1996) (Voice of CC Patchoone (ep. 39))
Seijuu Sentai Gingaman (1998-1999) (Voice of Captain Zahab)
Hyakujuu Sentai Gaoranger (2001-2002) (Voice of Highness Duke Org Rasetsu (Man Voice (Woman Voice : Hiromi Nishikawa)) (ep. 32-44 & 47-49))
Bakuryuu Sentai Abaranger (2003) (Voice of Trinoid 21: Reindeersanta (ep. 41))
Tokusou Sentai Dekaranger (2004) (Voice of Doggy's master (ep. 44))
Juuken Sentai Gekiranger (2007-2008) (Voice of Land Kenma Maku (ep. 22-35))
Tensou Sentai Goseiger: Epic on the Movie (2010) (Voice of Gyōten'ō of the Supernova)
OOO, Den-O, All Riders: Let's Go Kamen Riders (2011) (Voice of General Shadow)

Other live-action
 Sono Koe no Anata e (2022) (Himself)

Dubbing roles

Live-action
Apple of My Eye (Charlie (Burt Reynolds))
Awakening the Zodiac (Zodiac (Stephen McHattie))
Driven (2005 NTV edition) (Carl Henry (Burt Reynolds))
Exit Speed (Sgt. Archibald "Archie" Sparks (Fred Ward))
The Father (Anthony (Anthony Hopkins))
The Guns of Navarone (Andrea (Anthony Quinn))
Hand of Death (Shih Shao-Feng (James Tien))
Harry Potter and the Deathly Hallows – Part 1 (Kreacher (Simon McBurney))
Jesse Stone: Lost in Paradise (Jesse Stone (Tom Selleck))
Piranha 3D (Matt Boyd (Richard Dreyfuss))
Pirates of the Caribbean: Dead Man's Chest ("Bootstrap Bill" Turner (Stellan Skarsgård))
The Rock (Brigadier General Francis X. "Frank" Hummel (Ed Harris))
True Romance (Clifford Worley (Dennis Hopper))

Animation
Mutafukaz (Mr. K)
The Nut Job 2: Nutty by Nature (Mr. Feng)
Star Wars: Droids (Kleb Zellock)

References

External links
   
 Official agency profile 
 
 

1937 births
Living people
Aoni Production voice actors
Azabu High School alumni
Japanese male video game actors
Japanese male voice actors
Male voice actors from Tokyo
Tokyo Actor's Consumer's Cooperative Society voice actors
20th-century Japanese male actors
21st-century Japanese male actors